NA-40 (Tribal Area-I) is a constituency for the National Assembly of Pakistan comprising Utman Khel Subdivision, Barang Subdivision, Khar Bajaur Subdivision, Bar Chamer Kand Subdivision, Nawagai Subdivision, and Mandal and Shamozai sections of Salarzai Subdivision in Bajaur District.

Members of Parliament

2002–2018: NA-43 (Tribal Area-VIII)

Since 2018: NA-40 (Tribal Area-I)

Election 2002 

General elections were held on 10 Oct 2002. Maulvi Muhammad Sadiq an Independent candidate won by 13,097 votes.

Election 2008 

The result of general election 2008 in this constituency is given below.

Result 
Shaukatullah Khan succeeded in the election 2008 and became the member of National Assembly.

Election 2013 

General elections were held on 11 May 2013. Bismillah Khan an Independent candidate won by 13,929 votes and became the  member of National Assembly.

Election 2018 

General elections were held on 25 July 2018.

By-election 2023 
A by-election will be held on 19 March 2023 due to the resignation of Gul Dad Khan, the previous MNA from this seat.

See also
NA-39 (Dera Ismail Khan-II)
NA-41 (Tribal Area-II)

References

External links 
 Election result's official website

40
40